Thomas Morris (December 9, 1861September 17, 1928) was an American lawyer and politician in the U.S. state of Wisconsin. He served in the Wisconsin State Senate and was the 22nd Lieutenant Governor of Wisconsin from 1911 until 1915.

Early life
Morris was born in Saint-Hyacinthe, St. Arnold Parish, Quebec. He attended the common schools in Quebec before moving to La Crosse, Wisconsin where he worked as a barber. He graduated from the University of Wisconsin Law School in Madison, Wisconsin in 1889, and returned to La Crosse to practice law.

Political career
In 1898 he was elected District Attorney for La Crosse County, Wisconsin, and was reelected in 1900. He served as the chairman of the Republican Congressional Committee of the Seventh Congressional District before being elected to the Wisconsin State Senate in 1904 and 1908. Morris was instrumental in establishing what is now University of Wisconsin–La Crosse in 1909.

In 1911 Morris was elected Lieutenant Governor of Wisconsin as a Republican serving until 1915.

He died on September 17, 1928 in New York City of a heart attack at the age of 67.

Family life
Morris married Lillian L. Pendleton and had nine children.

References

Further reading
 Members of County Bar Association Discuss Life and Career of Tom Morris, May 29, 1932, 'La Crosse Tribune'.
 Thomas Morris, La Crosse Attorney, once Lieutenant Governor of State, June 5, 1932, 'La Crosse Tribune'.
 Heart Attack is Fatal to Tom Morris, September 17, 1932, 'La Crosse Tribune'.
 Newspaper clippings file courtesy of the La Crosse Public Library archives

1861 births
1928 deaths
Lieutenant Governors of Wisconsin
Republican Party Wisconsin state senators
University of Wisconsin–La Crosse
People from Saint-Hyacinthe
Anglophone Quebec people
Politicians from La Crosse, Wisconsin
District attorneys in Wisconsin
University of Wisconsin Law School alumni